A glacial relict is a population of a cold-adapted species that has been left behind as the range of the species changed after an ice age ended. Glacial relicts are usually found in enclaves "under relatively benign conditions".

Examples:
The biogeography of various aquatic species deemed glacial relicts that are found in Lake Sommen is likely related to a different geography during the early history of the lake. One theory claims that aquatic species were transferred from the Baltic Ice Lake through a natural lock system in connection with a temporary advance of the ice-front during the Younger Dryas. On land, the unusual occurrence of dwarf birch near Sund is also judged to be a leftover from a cold geological past.

See also
Biodiversity hotspot
Ecological island
Last Glacial Maximum refugia
Nunatak hypothesis
Rapoport's rule
Relict (biology)
Sky island
Wrangel Island (home to last population of mammoths)

References

Phytogeography
Biogeography
Ice ages
Prehistory of the Arctic

pl:Relikt glacjalny